Maralia may refer to:

a synonym for Polyscias, a genus of flowering plants
Maralia, a small village in the community of Kampanos, Crete, Greece